Doomsday Preppers was an American reality television series that aired on the National Geographic Channel from 2011 to 2014. The program profiles various survivalists, or "preppers", who are preparing to survive the various circumstances that may cause the end of civilization, including economic collapse, societal collapse, and electromagnetic pulse. The quality of their preparations is graded by the consulting company Practical Preppers, who provide analysis and recommendations for improvements.

Development
Casting for the first season began September 2011. Casting for a second season began April 2012. The series' third season premiered on October 29, 2013. The series concluded its fourth and final season in August 2014.

Dräger equipment, Wise Food Storage Company and the United States Gold Bureau are sponsors of the show.

Reception
Doomsday Preppers has received varied reviews. Neil Genzlinger in The New York Times condemned it as an "absurd excess on display and at what an easy target the prepper worldview is for ridicule", noting, "how offensively anti-life these shows are, full of contempt for humankind." Nevertheless, "The program has been a ratings bonanza, with a 60-percent male audience, with an average age of 44." "Doomsday Preppers is the network's most-watched series". Brooklyn Bagwell, casting director for the second season, claimed it was the highest-rated show in the history of the National Geographic Channel.

In response to negative comments, Jay Desai, who was featured in the show's first season, responded: "We don’t make it an obsession like some folks but we do spend a fair amount of time and money on it. ... you can’t always rely on the government or society to help you. The more people that are prepping minded, the better off we’ll all do."

Episodes

Season 1 (2012)

Season 2 (2012–13)

Season 3 (2013)

Season 4 (2014)

References

External links
 
 
 Interview of Season 2 family and Analysis

2010s American reality television series
2012 American television series debuts
2014 American television series endings
National Geographic (American TV channel) original programming
Survivalism in the United States